The Ilyushin Il-90 was a twin-engine, widebody aircraft proposed by the Ilyushin Design Bureau. First mentioned at the Farnborough air show in 1988, the Il-90 was a replacement for the Ilyushin Il-62M long-range narrowbody airliner. On a  sector, per-passenger fuel consumption would be . Powerplant choices included the NK-92, an  ducted propfan engine that was related to the Kuznetsov NK-93.

References 

Ilyushin aircraft
Abandoned military aircraft projects of the Soviet Union